A photographophone is a device that was first developed by Ernst Ruhmer of Berlin, Germany in 1900. The Photographophone could record and reproduce speech and music through a celluloid film. The process started by speaking into a microphone. The electrical signal from the microphone through a transformer supplied electric current from a battery pack that caused a corresponding variation in the light of an arc (later used an incandescent lamp). The light from the arc lamp passes through the cylindrical lens slot which created sharp white lines on the moving sensitive film. This film, after being taken out of the box and developed, shows a series of perpendicular striations parallel to one another, which are really a photographic record of the sound waves originally entering the telephone transmitter. 

To reproduce the sound an projector directs light through the film traveling with the velocity equal to that with which the record is made. Behind the film a sensitive selenium cell is mounted receiving the variations in light producing a variation in its resistance and a corresponding  effect in the telephone receivers connected.

"It is truly a wonderful process: sound becomes electricity, becomes light, causes chemical action, becomes light and electricity again, and finally sound."

References

External links
 THE ”PHOTOGRAPHOPHONE.”, BY ERNST RUHMER, Scientific American, July 20, 1901

Display technology
History of film
Film and video technology
Film sound production
Audiovisual introductions in 1900